Mískito Coast Creole or Nicaragua Creole English is an English-based creole language spoken in coastal Nicaraguan region of Mosquito Coast on the Caribbean Sea; its approximately  speakers are spread over a number of small villages. The region is today administratively separated into two autonomous regions: North Caribbean Coast and South Caribbean Coast. Mosquito is the nickname that is given to the region and earlier residents by early Europeans who visited and settled in the area. The term "Miskito" is now more commonly used to refer to both the people and the language.

Miskito creole is nearly identical to, and hence mutually intelligible with, Belizean Creole, and retains a high degree of intelligibility with all other Central American English creoles. It is also sometimes classified as a dialect of Jamaican Patois creole but this classification has been disputed.

It does not have the status of an official language in Nicaragua but it is a recognized language in the autonomous regions where it is spoken.

Geographic distribution
Speakers of Miskito Coast Creole are primarily persons of African, Amerindian, and European descent in the towns and on the offshore islands of the Miskito Coast. The main concentration of speakers is around Bluefields, capital of the South Caribbean Coast Autonomous Region, although a majority of inhabitants of the city are now Spanish-speaking immigrants.

Most of the creole speakers are located along the banks of the large rivers and lagoons that surround the area. Communities are found in Bluefields, in Pearl Lagoon, Bilwi, the offshore Corn Islands, Prinzapolka (Puerto Isabel), and San Juan del Norte (Greytown). Inland, the language is spoken in Siuna, Rosita, and Bonanza on the Prinzapolka River. On the Pacific coast, there are small numbers of speakers in Corinto, Puerto Sandino, and the Nicaraguan capital of Managua.  A smaller portion of the population stays in large towns along the northern Caribbean coast of Nicaragua and some also reside in Managua as well as other Central American countries.

Rama Cay Creole is a variety of the language spoken by the Rama people on Rama Cay, an island in the Bluefields Lagoon.

The environment is that of a tropical rainforest with an average rainfall of 448 centimeters and temperatures that range 26.4 °C ( 79 °F ) and up.

History
African slaves were shipwrecked on the Mosquito Coast as early as 1640, which started the interaction between them and the local Miskito population.

17th to 19th centuries 
The modern day Creoles' ancestors came as escapees from shipwrecked slave ships to the Nicaraguan Caribbean coast from Africa between the 17th and the late 18th centuries. The escapees went to the jungles and soon formed relations with the local Indigenous tribes and intermarried. The Coast was officially under British protection from 1740 to 1787 according to the Treaty of Friendship and Alliance with the Miskito Kingdom and remained under British influence until the late 19th century.

While they were here, the African population renewed and transformed ita culture and traits by taking elements of its African culture and mixing it with European culture along with the local Indian tribes which created a new culture. In 1787, the British abandoned their claims in the Mosquito coast in a treaty that was put forth. Slaves who ran away or who were abandoned had made their own African communities at Bluefields. Many escaped slaves from other islands had also come over to the area to settle down. Great Britain signed the Treaty of Managua which gave a portion of an area to the natives there and allowed it to be self-governed. That allowed for the African communities to grow and flourish. Their culture became solid after it had gained economic, political and social control over the Mosquito Coast. The people in the communities then began to start calling themselves Creoles.

In the mid-19th century, more English- or Creole-speaking laborers, primarily from Jamaica, were brought to the Coast as laborers. However, following the 1894 formal annexation of the Miskito Kingdom by Nicaragua, an increasing number of Spanish-speakers migrated to the area.

20th and 21st centuries 
The 1987 Constitution of Nicaragua granted autonomy to the Zelaya Department as two autonomous regions of the North and the South Caribbean Coast.

By the late 20th century, the coast was becoming more integrated economically and socially. The Creole people have now become a minority in the areas in which they had previously predominated. Many Creoles now speak mostly Spanish as well as creole and consider themselves to be only Nicaraguan. There are many Creoles who have now intermarried with mestizos even though many of Creoles still protest on how they lost their political and economic power to the mestizos.

Culture and Identification 
The Creoles of Nicaragua are said to be an Afro-Caribbean population that are mixed with Europeans, Africans and Amerindians. Their culture is influenced by West African and British roots along with mestizos and miskito. Some food that is used in their cooking consists of coconut oil, taro root, manioc and other elements such as wheat flour and other processed foods. They have their own musical style which can be compared to West Indian calypso.

Language details 
The Nicaraguan Creole English language is spoken as a primary first language by only 35,000 to 50,000 Creoles, Nicaraguan Garifuna, and some Miskitos. The language is being quickly replaced with Spanish with fewer and fewer people speaking it.

See also
Belizean Creole
Jamaican Creole
Miskito language
Miskito people
San Andrés-Providencia Creole

References

Bibliography
Ken Decker and Andy Keener. "A Report on the English-Lexifier Creole of Nicaragua, also known as Miskito Coast Creole, with special reference to Bluefields and the Corn Islands." Summer Institute of Linguistics.  February 1998.

Further reading 
 Creole Languages . (n.d.). Retrieved March 9, 2017, from http://aboutworldlanguages.com/creole-languages
 Creoles of Nicaragua. (n.d.). Retrieved March 9, 2017, from http://www.encyclopedia.com/humanities/encyclopedias-almanacs-transcripts-and-maps/creoles-nicaragua
 Explore Nicaragua Languages. (n.d.). Retrieved March 9, 2017, from http://www.nicaragua.com/languages/
 Creoles of Nicaragua - Orientation. (n.d.). Retrieved March 9, 2017, from http://www.everyculture.com/Middle-America-Caribbean/Creoles-of-Nicaragua-Orientation.html
 Mühlhäusler, P. (2015). Zeitschrift Für Dialektologie Und Linguistik, 82(1), 115–118. Retrieved from https://www.jstor.org/stable/43821567
 Did you know Nicaragua Creole English is vulnerable? (n.d.). Retrieved March 9, 2017, from http://www.endangeredlanguages.com/lang/4025

Miskito
English-based pidgins and creoles
Languages of Nicaragua
English language in North America
Creoles of the Americas
North Caribbean Coast Autonomous Region
South Caribbean Coast Autonomous Region
Languages of the African diaspora